Major-General Alfred Alexander Kennedy  (1870–1926) was a British Army officer.

Military career
Kennedy was commissioned into the 3rd The King's Own Hussars on 10 October 1891. He was promoted to lieutenant on 16 November 1892, and to captain on 23 May 1896. After transferring to British India, he was in March 1901 appointed aide-de-camp to Lieutenant-General Sir George Luck, Commanding the Forces, Bengal Command, and from April the same year also held a temporary appointment as Assistant Military Secretary to the command.

Kennedy commanded the 4th Cavalry Division at the Battle of Cambrai in November 1917 and, after becoming commander of 230th Brigade in July 1918, he commanded the brigade in the Hundred Days Offensive. After the war he served as a Military Governor in Occupied German Territory and then became General Officer Commanding the 49th (West Riding) Infantry Division in June 1923 before his death in March 1926.

He was colonel of the 3rd The King's Own Hussars from 1924 until his death in 1926.

Family
In 1898, he married Dora Campbell, daughter of Walter Thomas Rowley.

References

Sources
 

1870 births
1926 deaths
British Army generals of World War I
Companions of the Order of the Bath
Companions of the Order of St Michael and St George
3rd The King's Own Hussars officers
British Army major generals